Flavius Julius Constantius (died September 337 AD) was a politician of the Roman Empire and a member of the Constantinian dynasty, being a son of Emperor Constantius Chlorus and his second wife Flavia Maximiana Theodora, a younger half-brother of Emperor Constantine the Great and the father of Emperor Julian.

Biography 

Julius Constantius was born after 289, the son of Constantius Chlorus and his wife Theodora, adoptive daughter of emperor Maximian. He had two brothers, Dalmatius and Hannibalianus, and three sisters, Constantia, Anastasia and Eutropia. Emperor Constantine I was his half-brother, as he was the son of Constantius and Helena. Despite this illustrious kinship Julius Constantius was never himself emperor or co-emperor; Constantine, however, gave him the title of patricius.

Julius Constantius was married twice. With his first wife, Galla, sister of the later consuls Vulcacius Rufinus and Neratius Cerealis, he had two sons and a daughter. His eldest son, whose name is not recorded, was murdered in 337 together with his father. His second son Constantius Gallus, was appointed Caesar by his cousin Constantius II. His daughter was the first wife of Constantius II. It has been proposed that Galla and Julius had another daughter, born between 324 and 331 and married to Justus, mother of Justina, whose daughter, wife of Emperor Theodosius I, was called Galla.

After the death of his first wife, Julius Constantius married a Greek woman Basilina, the daughter of the governor of Egypt, Julius Julianus. Basilina gave him another son, the future emperor Julian the Apostate, but died before her husband, in 332/333. Nothing is known about other marriages of Julius Constantius, but since the sources about him are rather poor, other marriages are of course not excluded.
Allegedly at the instigation of his stepmother Helena, Julius Constantius did not live initially at the court of his half brother, but together with Dalmatius and Hannibalianus in Tolosa, in Etruria, the birthplace of his son Gallus, and in Corinth. Finally, he was called to Constantinople, and was able to build a good relationship with Constantine.

Constantine favoured his half-brother, appointing him patricius and Consul for the year 335, together with Ceionius Rufius Albinus. However, in 337, after the death of Constantine, several male members of the Constantinian dynasty were killed, among them Constantius (whose property was confiscated) and his eldest son; his two younger sons, however, survived, because in 337 they were still children. They would later be elevated to the rank of caesar and augustus, respectively.

References

3rd-century births
337 deaths
4th-century Romans
Ancient Roman murder victims
Constantinian dynasty
Imperial Roman consuls
Julii
Patricii
Year of birth unknown
Sons of Roman emperors
Julian (emperor)